Aiono Fina'i Tile Gafa (born ~1961) is a Samoan politician. He is a member of the Human Rights Protection Party.

Aiono was educated at Fasito'o-uta Primary School and Leulumoega Fou College. He lived in New Zealand and Australia, then returned to Samoa in the 1980s, where he worked for the Peace Corps.

He was first elected to the Legislative Assembly of Samoa in the 2004 A'ana Alofi No 1 By-election. He was re-elected at the 2006 election. He lost his seat at the 2011 election. He stood unsuccessfully at the 2016 election, after which he lodged an electoral petition alleging corruption and bribery against Speaker of the House Leaupepe Toleafoa Faafisi. The petition was later withdrawn. He unsuccessfully contested the 2021 election.

He was re-elected to Parliament in the 2021 Samoan by-elections, winning by just 19 votes.

References

Living people
1961 births
People from A'ana
Members of the Legislative Assembly of Samoa
Human Rights Protection Party politicians